The Lower Muskogee Creek Tribe (East of the Mississippi), also known as the Lower Muskogee Creek Tribe, is a state-recognized tribe in Georgia. The organization was denied federal recognition in 1981.

They claim to descend from Muscogee Creek people who evaded Indian Removal in the 1830s and remained in Georgia. Their mission is "To maintain and educate Tribe members and general public regarding tribal history and traditions."

Nonprofit status 
The group organized as a 501(c)(3) nonprofit organization in Georgia in 1973. They are based in Whigham, Georgia, and Nealie McCormick is their agent. Their officers are:
 Marian S. McCormick, CEO, chief
 Ashley Adams, CFO
 C. Peggy Venable, secretary
 Nealie McCormick, agent 

They also organized as a nonprofit in the state of Florida in 1989; however, they are listed as being inactive.

Petition for federal recognition 
In 1978, the Lower Muskogee Creek Tribe–East of the Mississippi petitioned for federal recognition. The Office of Federal Acknowledgment denied their petition in 1981. The office noted that the Lower Muskogee Creek Tribe's membership criteria "contained no specific requirements for establishing Creek Indian ancestry" and observed that "The LMC is not a tribal community which has functioned as an autonomous entity throughout history until the present, but is rather a group of individuals who believe themselves to be of Indian ancestry, most of whom did not conclusively establish this fact."

The office's findings showed a "total lack of documentation for any period before the 1950's of the covert or overt existence of any time of community for even part of the group which could be identified as Indian" and "coupled with the finding that the majority did not establish Creek Indian ancestry and that many had no previous identity as Indian or even knowledge of Indian ancestry, indicates that the LMC is not derived from a stable tribal community."

State-recognition 
The Georgia General Assembly founded the Georgia Council on American Indian Concerns and "is the only state entity specifically authorized to address the concerns of Georgia's American Indians." The council recognizes three state-recognized tribes, including the Lower Muskogee Creek Tribe, who were recognized through state law GA Code Section 44-12-300.

Activities 
The Lower Muskogee Creek Tribe holds the annual Tama Intertribal Powwow in Whigham.

Notes

References

External links
 Lower Muskogee Creek Tribe, official website
 Acknowledgment Decision Compilation (ADC) for Petitioner #008 (Lower Muskogee Creek Tribe-East of the Ms, Ga)

Muscogee
Native American tribes in Georgia (U.S. state)
Non-profit organizations based in Georgia (U.S. state)
Organizations established in 1972
State-recognized tribes in the United States